Wreckage is a 1925 American silent drama film directed by Scott R. Dunlap and starring May Allison, Holmes Herbert, and John Miljan.

Cast
 May Allison as Rene
 Holmes Herbert as Stuart Ames
 John Miljan as Maurice Dysart
 Rosemary Theby as Margot
 James W. Morrison as Grant Demarest

References

Bibliography
 Goble, Alan. The Complete Index to Literary Sources in Film. Walter de Gruyter, 1999.

External links
 

1925 films
1925 drama films
1920s English-language films
American silent feature films
Silent American drama films
American black-and-white films
Films directed by Scott R. Dunlap
1920s American films